The following is a list of the MTV Europe Music Award winners and nominees for Best Baltic Act.

2000s

References

MTV Europe Music Awards
Estonian music
Lithuanian music
Latvian music
Baltic states
Awards established in 2006